Gabrielle Groneberg (born 19 September 1955) is a German politician from the Social Democratic Party.

Political career 
She was a Member of the Bundestag from 2002 to 2009, and then 2012 to 2013, then 2014 to 2017.

In the four federal elections from 2002 to 2013, Groneberg was also the SPD candidate for the direct mandate in the Cloppenburg-Vechta constituency, a stronghold of the CDU. She was defeated by the CDU candidates every time.

References

See also 

Living people
1955 births
Members of the Landtag of Lower Saxony
Members of the Bundestag for Lower Saxony
21st-century German politicians
21st-century German women politicians
Female members of the Bundestag
People from Cloppenburg

Members of the Bundestag 2002–2005
Members of the Bundestag 2005–2009
Members of the Bundestag 2009–2013
Members of the Bundestag 2013–2017
Members of the Bundestag for the Social Democratic Party of Germany